Annapurna Conservation Area is Nepal's largest protected area covering  in the Annapurna range of the Himalayas. The conservation area stretches across Manang, Mustang, Kaski, Myagdi, and Lamjung Districts.
Annapurna Conservation Area encompasses Annapurna Sanctuary and is known for several trekking routes including Annapurna Circuit.

History 
The Annapurna Conservation Area was established in 1985 and gazetted in 1992. It is managed by the National Trust for Nature Conservation.

Climate 
Rainfall in the southern part of the Annapurnas is higher than in the rain shadow to the north of the peaks. In the winter of 1999–2000, areas above  were snow-covered until end of March, and until May above .

References

External links

 Department of National Parks and Wildlife Conservation, Nepal: Annapurna Conservation Area

Protected areas of Nepal
1992 establishments in Nepal
Wildlife conservation in Nepal